The 2021 President's Cup II was a professional tennis tournament played on outdoor hard courts. It was the sixteenth edition of the tournament which was part of the 2021 ATP Challenger Tour. It took place in Nur-Sultan, Kazakhstan between 19 and 25 July 2021.

Singles main-draw entrants

Seeds

 1 Rankings are as of 12 July 2021.

Other entrants
The following players received wildcards into the singles main draw:
  Grigoriy Lomakin
  Dostanbek Tashbulatov
  Beibit Zhukayev

The following players received entry from the qualifying draw:
  Artem Dubrivnyy
  Oleksii Krutykh
  Edan Leshem
  Benjamin Lock

The following player received entry as a lucky loser:
  Ergi Kırkın

Champions

Singles

 Andrey Kuznetsov def.  Jason Kubler 6–3, 2–1 ret.

Doubles

 Hsu Yu-hsiou /  Benjamin Lock def.  Oleksii Krutykh /  Grigoriy Lomakin 6–3, 6–4.

References

President's Cup (tennis)
2021 ATP Challenger Tour
2021 in Kazakhstani sport
July 2021 sports events in Asia